Quebec French profanities, known as  ("to consecrate"), are words and expressions related to Catholicism and its liturgy that are used as strong profanities in Quebec French (the main variety of Canadian French) and in Acadian French (spoken in Maritime Provinces, east of Quebec, and a small portion of Aroostook County, Maine, in the United States).  are considered stronger in Canada than the foul expressions common to other varieties of French, which centre on sex and excrement (such as , "shit").

History
The  originated in the early 19th century, when the social control exerted by the Catholic clergy was increasingly a source of frustration. It is known to have been in use as early as the 1830s. The word  in its current meaning is believed to come from the expression  ("Don't say that, it is sacred/holy"). Eventually,  started to refer to the words Quebecers were not supposed to say. This is likely related to the commandment "Thou shalt not take the name of the Lord thy God in vain" (Exodus 20:7). The influence and social importance of Catholicism at that time allowed  to become powerful forms of profanity.

As a result of the Quiet Revolution in the 1960s, the influence of the Roman Catholic Church in Quebec has declined but the profanity still remains in use today.

List of common 
The nouns here can also be modified for use as verbs (see "Non-profane uses", below).

Many combinations are possible, one of the more fascinating aspects of Quebec profanity. Since swear words are voluntarily blasphemous, the spellings are usually different from the words from which they originate. There is no general agreement on how to write these words, and the Office québécois de la langue française does not regulate them. 
  : "baptism"
  : "chalice"
  : "ciborium" or "pyx", receptacles in which the host is stored
  : "Sacrament"
  : "Saint", added before others (ex.
  : from the sin of simony
  : "tabernacle"; typically considered the most profane of the 
  : "the Virgin Mary"

Mild forms
Most  have modified, milder euphemistic forms (see minced oath). Such forms are not usually considered nearly as rude as the original. They are the equivalent of English words such as "gosh", "heck", or "darn". Many of the euphemistic forms are only similar-sounding to religious terms, so are considered not to denigrate the Church directly.

 : 
 : 
 : 
 :  (from the English "cream puff"), 
 : 
 : 
 : 

The following are also considered milder profanity:

 : "bastard"
 : "boob", used to denote a complete idiot
 : "harm to God"

This phrase when pronounced quickly by a native speaker sounds like  ("holy ciborium of the tabernacle").

Intricate forms

In Canadian French, swear words can be combined into more powerful combinations to express extreme anger or disgust. These intricate uses of French profanities can be difficult to master. The combinations are endless; some people in both Quebec and francophone communities in other provinces community consider mixing and matching swear words to be a sort of skilled art.

The whole sentence can be summarized as "I'm gonna beat your fucking face in, you motherfucker".
 : Very strong expression of anger. Can also be used as a descriptive phrase expressing anger or derision: ,  ("Jesus fucking Christ, there's no way you can be this stupid").
 : Expressive of extreme anger.
 : Expressive of very extreme anger.
 : Denotes extreme apathy and suppressed anger, similar to the English "I don't give a fuck". : "I don't give a fuck about politicians."

Use
Depending on the context and the tone of the phrases, it might make everybody quiet, but some people use these words to add rhythm or emphasis to sentences.

Usually, more than one of these words is used in Franco-Canadian profanity. Long strings of invective can be connected in this way, and the resulting expression does not have to have any concrete meaning—for example,  (literally, "My host of (the) holy sacrament of (the) chalice of Christ"). In areas where English is also commonly spoken, English expletives are often inserted. ("Fuck [the] host") is common in Quebec.

The adjective  (with meanings varying from "crazy, disturbed" to "broken down") is much milder than "fucked" is in English. It is routinely used in, for instance, TV sitcom dialogue. The same goes for "shit" (which in Quebec French is used only as an interjection expressing dismay, never as the noun for excrement). When used as a verb,  (literally, "Go shit"), means not to excrete but rather to "fuck off". When used in the past-tense , it is used exactly as :  ("My shoes are fucked", literally: "My shoes are shitted").

Even English-language dialogue containing these words can appear on Quebec French-language television without bleeping. For example, in 2003, when punks rioted in Montreal because a concert by the band The Exploited had been cancelled, TV news reporters solemnly read out a few lyrics and song titles from their album Fuck the System. The same is not true of Quebec's English-language television stations, which follow the same guidelines as other stations in Canada. In November 2017 the CRTC ruled that "fuck" is not a swear word in French.

Non-profane uses

 are often used as verbs too. For example,  means "to beat the fuck out of", "to kick one's ass" or, more literally, "to give a beating", where  is used as a stronger form of "to give" ( in French).

In the movie Bon Cop, Bad Cop, Quebec actor and stand-up comic Patrick Huard's character teaches Colm Feore's how to swear properly.

More traditional singers also use these words, such as Quebec singer Plume Latraverse.

The phrase  ("Jules, who was irritated, violently ejected Jacques, who was angry.") becomes  ("That fucker, who was pissed off, kicked out that dickhead, who was fucking furious.") with each content word (noun, verb, adjective or adverb) replaced with a profane synonym.

Comparison to other languages
The use of liturgical profanity is not unique to Canadian French or Quebec. The word  has produced the verb , which colloquially means "to use blasphemy".

Spanish also uses  ("I shit on ...") followed by "God", "the blessed chalice", "the Virgin" and other terms, religious or not. In Romanian, the profanity  ("Your mother's host!") is sometimes used with "Easter", "Christ", "Cross", "Commemoration", "sacred oil lamp", "God", "Church", etc.

Sheila Fischman's translation of La Guerre, yes Sir! (published under that title in French and English and meaning roughly "War, you bet!"), by Roch Carrier, leaves many  in the original Quebec French, since they have no real equivalent in English. She gives a brief explanation and history of these terms in her introduction, including a few not listed here. At a crucial point in the story, a boy swears in the presence of his father. For the first time, instead of beating or punishing his son, the father swears back. This represents the boy's passage into manhood.

Irish Catholics of old employed a similar practice, whereby "ejaculations" were used to express frustration without cursing or profaning (taking the Lord's name in vain). This typically involved the recitation of a rhyming couplet, where a shocked person might say, "Jesus who, for love of me / Died on the Cross at Calvary" instead of "Jesus!" This is often abbreviated simply to "Jesus-hoo-fer-luv-a-me", an expression still heard among elderly Irish people. "Jesus, Mary and Joseph!" is used in Quebec French: 

See also 

 Joual
 Sacred-profane dichotomy

References

External links
 Swearing in Quebec: If you profane something no one holds sacred, does it make a swear? — The Economist

French Quebec
Culture of Quebec
Profanity